The Peloton supercomputer purchase is a program at the Lawrence Livermore National Laboratory intended to provide tera-FLOP computing capability using commodity Scalable Units (SUs). The Peloton RFP defines the system configurations.

Appro was awarded the contract for Peloton which includes the following machines:

All of the machines run the CHAOS variant of Red Hat Enterprise Linux and the Moab resource management system.  Under the project management of John Lee, the team at Synnex, Voltaire, Supermicro and other suppliers, the scientists were able to dramatically reduce the amount of time it took to go from starting the cluster build to actually having hardware at Livermore in production. In particular, it went from having four SUs on the floor on a Thursday, to bringing in two more SUs for the final cluster and by Saturday, having all of them wired up, burned in, and running Linpack.

References 
 

Lawrence Livermore National Laboratory
Supercomputers